Michael van Vuren (born 3 April 1990) is an Italian rugby union player,  currently playing with Italian side Rugby Calvisano, currently competing in the Top12 and European Rugby Continental Shield based in Calvisano (Province of Brescia), in Lombardy. Van Vuren, who is a Lock or Number eight played for Zebre in the Pro12 of the rugby union competition originally known as the Celtic League.

Career
Although born in East London, Eastern Cape, South Africa, Van Vuren is eligible to play for the Italy national rugby union team on residency grounds. He made his debut for the Emerging Italy team on 8 June 2012 in the 2012 IRB Nations Cup against Russia.

Zebre Pro12

Van Vuren, who is a Lock or Number eight played rugby for Zebre in 2012/2013 and 2013/2014. He played 22 matches in the Pro12 and 9 in the Heineken cup.

Rugby Mogliano

Van Vuren played 50 games for Mogliano, scoring 3 tries, playing Lock.

Rugby San Donà

Van Vuren signs with Rugby San Donà di Piave, in the metropolitan city of Venice to join San Donà the National Championship of Excellence side.  He played 18 games, starting 17.

Lafert San Donà wins the Final of the Excellence Trophy for 24 to 0, signing a historical result in the record of the Rugby San Donà club and the first Trofeo won by South African trainer Zane Ansell against Fiamme Oro Rugby.

Rugby Calvisano

Van Vuren signs with Rugby Calvisano. which is based in Calvisano (Province of Brescia), in Lombardy, as  Lock or Number eight.

References

1990 births
Living people
Italian rugby union players
South African rugby union players
Rugby union number eights
Rugby union players from East London, Eastern Cape
Zebre Parma players